Újszilvás is a village and commune in the county of Pest in Hungary.

Populated places in Pest County